Dicarpidium is a genus of flowering plants belonging to the family Malvaceae.

Its native range is Northwestern Australia.

Species:
 Dicarpidium monoicum F.Muell.

References

Byttnerioideae
Malvaceae genera